The Pilatus PC-24 is a light business jet produced by Pilatus Aircraft of Switzerland.
Following the success of the PC-12 single engine turboprop, work on the twin engine jet began in 2007 for greater range and speed, keeping the rugged airfield capability.
The aircraft was introduced on 21 May 2013 and rolled out on 1 August 2014, with the maiden flight on 11 May 2015. The PC-24 received EASA and FAA type certification on 7 December 2017 and the first customer delivery was on 7 February 2018.
Powered by two Williams FJ44 turbofans, it competes with the Embraer Phenom 300 and the Cessna Citation CJ4.

Development

During the 1990s, Pilatus Aircraft had brought to market the Pilatus PC-12, a single-engine turboprop-powered business aircraft. As the PC-12 quickly proved to be a commercial success, Pilatus sought to follow up with a complementary aircraft and began gathering feedback from customers of the type. In response to this request, several customers reportedly expressed a desire for an aircraft that would possess both a greater range and top speed than the existing PC-12, while retaining the type's overall ruggedness and ability to make use of very short runways. Based on this feedback, Pilatus elected to pursue development of such an aircraft. In 2007, Pilatus initiated work on the program. Development of the aircraft was conducted using existing company funds. The design program was first mentioned by Pilatus in its May 2011 annual report.

On 21 May 2013, the PC-24 was introduced to the public at the European Business Aviation Convention & Exhibition (EBACE) in Geneva. At the time, Pilatus chairman Oscar Schwenk claimed the PC-24 did not fit into any existing business jet categories, and stated that the aircraft was the only one that combined "...the versatility of a turboprop with the cabin size of a medium light jet, and the performance of a light jet".

On 1 August 2014, which is also Switzerland's national day, P01, the first of the three PC-24 prototypes, was rolled out. Each of these three prototypes serve different functions in the development program; P01 is intended for exploring the flight envelope of the type, P02 is mainly for trialling the avionics and autopilot integration, and will spend much of its testing life in the US, while P03 is to be representative of production aircraft and will incorporate improvements made based upon the development work performed with the other two aircraft.

Flight testing

The first flight of the prototype had been originally anticipated to take place in late 2014, but this was delayed. On 11 May 2015, P01 conducted its first flight from Buochs Airport, Switzerland, for a total of 55 minutes. The occasion marked the start of test flights for the aircraft's two-year certification campaign. At the time, type certification  and initial deliveries were anticipated for 2017.

On 16 November 2015, P02, the second prototype, performed its maiden flight, lasting for 82 minutes; by this date, P01 had accumulated a total of 150 flying hours and had performed over 100 flights. In May 2016, P01 took an brief intermission in the test program to appear on static display at EBACE; by this point, P01 and P02 had accumulated more than 500 flight hours between them. During EBACE 2016, it was commented that the program was on track and test flights had been free of surprises; during a transatlantic crossing to the US, P02 had achieved a cruise speed in excess of 800 km/h (432 kt.), which was better than expected.

The PC-24 flight-test fleet was completed with the addition of the third prototype of P03 in March 2017; by May they had logged 950 flights and 1,525 hours. In August 2017, Williams International received type and production certification from the EASA and FAA for its FJ44-4A-QPM while the three test aircraft accumulated over 1,700h of flight tests, on schedule for certification and introduction in the fourth quarter.
By October 2017, more than 2,000 hours had been flown, with the P01 prototype flying 626 times and 900 hours. The P03 prototype will complete a functional and reliability program, including 150 hours over six weeks before certification is completed and initial deliveries commence.

The three prototypes flew 2205 hours including icing conditions and very hot temperatures, outside its flight envelope, bird strikes, structural stress tests and noise tests before it received EASA and FAA type certification on 7 December 2017. Its performance goals were met or exceeded, like its maximum speed raised from 425 to 440 knots (787 to 815 km/h).

In the fourth quarter of 2018,the aircraft was certified to land on dry sand and gravel. Australian RFDS was scheduled to start medevac in 2019.
Transport Canada certification was awarded on 27 June 2019.
In February 2020, the design was approved for rough field operation, certifying the aircraft to operate from grass, wet earth and snow-covered surfaces, following a multiyear certification campaign.

As of February 2020, the aircraft can operate from grass, wet earth, dry sand, gravel and snow.

Production

In late 2014, an agreement between Pilatus and FlightSafety International will see the latter conduct US-based PC-24 pilot and technician training in Dallas, Texas. In May 2017, series production was under way for a fourth quarter first delivery to PlaneSense, following certification.

In December 2017, eight PC-24s were on the assembly line and 23 deliveries were planned for 2018. The first customer delivery was completed on 7 February 2018 to PlaneSense.

In 2018, 23 to 24 were planned for delivery, with 40 planned for 2019 and then 50 per year.

Orders and deliveries
At the May 2014 EBACE, Pilatus sold the initial production run of 84 units 36 hours after orders opened. This first batch of orders is to be delivered until early 2020. Orders were to reopen after publishing the aircraft's final performance data and assessing operators' feedback. Throughout its 40-year lifecycle, Pilatus plan to produce 4,000 units.
A PC-24 was ordered to transport the Swiss Federal Council.
When it was certified in December 2017, it was priced at US$8.9M.

On 26 November 2018, the first of five was delivered to the Royal Flying Doctor Service of Australia, supplementing its 35 PC-12s single turboprops.
Unpaved and short 856 m (2,810 ft) runways should be allowed next, and it should enter service in early 2019 as an air ambulance with three beds and an electric stretcher loader. They feature individual oxygen, vacuum and power systems for patient monitoring and support installed under a supplemental type certificate by aircraft medical interiors specialist Aerolite AG, for $13 million complete each.

By May 2019, Pilatus had sold 30 units and reopened the PC-24 orderbook at the EBACE show, with about 80 delivery positions made available at a price of $10.7 million each, for late 2020 and 2021 deliveries. Of these new positions half were sold within days. The PC-24 had been granted European and US steep approach certification, including for London City airport's 5.5° approach and short runway, plus dirt and gravel runway operations. Rough-field certification was approved for grass, wet earth and snow operations in late January 2020.

The 50th was delivered by October 2019, and the 100th by January 2021.
In 2022, its equipped price was $M.

Design

The PC-24 is the company's first jet-powered aircraft. Several competing business aircraft were identified early on, including Embraer's Phenom 300 and Cessna's Citation CJ4.

It is a low-wing cantilever cabin monoplane powered by two Williams FJ44-4A turbofans, each mounted in a nacelle on the side of the rear fuselage.  It has a T-tail and a retractable tricycle landing gear.
The aircraft is designed to operate from short and rough airstrips and incorporates an advanced wing design, with a large double-slotted flap system to achieve the necessary performance, having a stall speed of only 81 knots at the maximum landing weight.
The long-stroke trailing link landing gear smooths out uneven surfaces, the dual-wheel main wheels have  of pressure to prevent sinking in soft surfaces, and the wing flaps have a replaceable, abradable surface and shields the high mounted engines from loose debris.

The cabin has room for ten passengers in the cabin and one or two pilots. The cabin has three exits, a passenger door on the left-hand side near the front, overwing emergency exits on each side of the aircraft, and a cargo door on the left-hand side at the rear. Pilatus claims the PC-24 is the first business jet to be fitted with this standard pallet-sized cargo door.

The interior color schemes of the PC-24 have been designed by BMW Designworks; interiors for the Americas are to be completed at a facility in Broomfield, Colorado, which will be expanded by 50% to cope with the extra demand.

Pilatus and Honeywell cooperatively designed the Advanced Cockpit Environment for the type. This is intended to reduce pilot workload and allows the PC-24 to be single-pilot certified. The avionics system is based on Honeywell Primus Epic 2.

In July 2021, the design was updated with a number of refinements for new-build aircraft that can also be retro-fitted to earlier production aircraft. These updates included newly designed, lighter and more comfortable, quick release cabin seats; an optional galley to replace the forward coat closet; touchscreen-controlled avionics; tactile feedback in pitch and roll, plus limit protection; pilot-defined visual approaches and automated audible callouts. Also approved were True Blue Power lithium ion battery sets which are  lighter and less expensive to maintain.

Operators

The aircraft is popular with air charter companies and is also operated by private companies.

By January 2021, the fleet of 100 jets has logged 33,500 flight hours, including 2,375 hours by the fleet leader.

Military

 Qatar Emiri Air Force: 2 aircraft

 Swiss Air Force: 1 aircraft

Specifications

See also

References

External links

 

Pilatus aircraft
2010s Swiss business aircraft
Twinjets
Low-wing aircraft
Aircraft first flown in 2015
T-tail aircraft